Gonzalo Eduardo Robles García (Santiago, April 22, 1952), is a Chilean film, theater and television actor and comedian.

Biography

Robles studied at Colegio San Ignacio. Later he started a career in Civil Construction at the Pontificia Universidad Católica de Chile, but withdrew to enter the School of Theater at the University of Chile.

He was married to the actress Coca Guazzini with whom he had his son Camilo, later in another relationship he had his children Antonio and Concepción. He is currently married to film director Tatiana Gaviola.

He was a founding member of the Teatro Imagen Company. He has acted in more than 30 theatrical works, among them "The raw, the cooked, the rotten", "The last train", "You called yourself Rosicler", "The kiss of the spider woman", "Pachamama", "Neruda" , "A perfectly ridiculous being", "Machísimo", "Delinquent and bipolar", "Our women".

In cinema, Robles has acted in 11 films including: Latent Image, The Magnetic Tree, Stretched out looking at the stars, and The verses of oblivion. On television, he has been part of the film-making and acting team of comedy shows such as Los Eguiguren, De Chincol a Jote, Jaguar you, Na´que ver con Chile and Mi tío y yo.

Robles has acted in 10 seasons of Teatro en Chilevisión. In TV series: Reporteras, Los Cárcamo, Infieles, Mis años Grossos and the highly praised Los 80. He has participated in more than 18 TV soap productions, among which are: La Madrastra, La Señora, Las Herederas, Rojo y Miel, Playa Salvaje, Vivir con 10, Mala Conducta, El amor lo manejo yo, Matriarcas and Un diablo con ángel.

In 2020, he revived the show Los Eguiguren en pandemia along with fellow actors from the 80s Coca Guazzini, Malucha Pinto and Cristián García-Huidobro in the context of the Coronavirus Pandemic by streaming.

Filmography

Films

TV soaps

TV series

References

1952 births
Living people
Chilean male film actors
Chilean male television actors
20th-century Chilean male actors
21st-century Chilean male actors
Chilean male comedians